The Players Tour Championship 2015/2016 was a series of snooker tournaments which started on 29 July 2015 and ended on 27 March 2016, with events held across Europe and Asia. In this season the European events form the European Tour and events held in Asia the Asian Tour. This season there were seven regular minor-ranking events down from nine the previous season concluding with the finals which held full Ranking event status.

Schedule

Order of Merit
The prize money collected at each PTC tournament is summed up to obtain the European and Asian Tour Order of Merit. The top 24 from the European Tour Order of Merit, the top 2 from the Asian Tour Order of Merit plus six more from a combination of both lists will qualify for the PTC finals in Manchester.

European Tour 

After 6 out of 6 events:

Asian Tour 
After 1 out of 1 events:

Both 
After 7 out of 7 events:

(Top 6 players of all 7 PTC events who haven't already qualified)

Notes

References